{{Infobox military conflict
| conflict          = Hundred Regiments Offensive
| partof            = the Second Sino-Japanese War and World war II
| image             = Hundred Regiments Offensive 1940.jpg
| image_size        = 200px
| caption           = Victorious Chinese Communist soldiers holding the flag of the Republic of China.
| date              = 20 August – 5 December 1940
| place             = North China
| coordinates       = 
| result            = Chinese victory
| combatant1        = 
 Chinese Communist Party
| combatant2        = 
 Reorganized National Government
| units1            = 8th Route Army
| units2            = North China Area ArmyCollaborationist Chinese Army
| commander1        = Peng DehuaiZhu DeZuo Quan
| commander2        = Hayao Tada
| strength1         = 200,000
| strength2         =  270,000 Japanese troops 150,000 Chinese collaborators
| casualties1       = 22,000–100,000 (counting desertions)<ref name="autogenerated">Tower of Skulls: A History of the Asia-Pacific War, Vol 1: July 1937-May 1942'; Frank, Richard B.; p. 161.</ref>Chinese figure (8th Route Army only): 17,000 casualties and more than 20,000 poisoned
| casualties2       = Several record from different sources:
1. Chinese Communist has two records: the first one is 12,645 killed and wounded, 281 POW. The second record: 20,645 Japanese and 5,155 Chinese collaborators killed and wounded, 281 Japanese and 18,407 Chinese collaborators captured王人广《关于百团大战战绩统计的依据问题》(Wang Renguang <Issue of the basis of result statistics of Hundred Regiments Offensive >),《抗日战争研究 (The Journal of Studies of China＇s Resistance War Against Japan ISSN 1002-9575)》1993 issue 3, p. 243
2. Japanese military record: No figure about total casualties, 276 KIAs from 4th Independent Mixed Brigade. 133 KIA and 31 MIA from 2nd Independent Mixed Brigade. 
3. Western sources: 20,900 Japanese casualties and about 20,000 collaborator casualties
4. Peng's estimate: 30,000 Japanese and collaborators
| campaignbox       = 
}}

The Hundred Regiments Offensive also known as the Hundred Regiments Campaign (20 August – 5 December 1940) was a major campaign of the Chinese Communist Party's National Revolutionary Army divisions. It was commanded by Peng Dehuai against the Imperial Japanese Army in Central China. The battle had long been the focus of propaganda in the history of Chinese Communist Party but had become Peng Dehuai's "crime" during the Cultural Revolution. Certain issues regarding its launching and consequences are still controversial.

Background
In 1939–1940, the Japanese launched more than 109 small campaigns involving around 1,000 combatants each and 10 large campaigns of 10,000 men each to wipe out Communist guerrillas in the Hebei and Shandong plains. In addition, the army of Wang Jingwei's collaborationist Reorganized National Government had its offensive against the CCP guerrillas.

There was also a general sentiment among the anti-Japanese resistance forces – particularly in the Kuomintang – that the CCP was not contributing enough to the war effort, and that they were only interested in expanding their power base. It was out of these circumstances that the CCP planned to stage a great offensive to prove that they were helping the war effort and to mend KMT-CCP relations.

Battle

The Japanese North China Area Army estimated the strength of communist regulars to be about 88,000 in December 1939. Two years later, they revised the estimate to 140,000. On the eve of the battle, the Communist forces grew to 200,000 - 400,000 men strong, in 105 regiments. The extraordinary success and expansion of the 8th Route Army against the Japanese had Zhu De and the rest of the military leadership hoping that they could engage the Japanese army and win.

By 1940, growth was so impressive that Zhu De ordered a coordinated offensive by most of the communist regulars (46 regiments from the 115th Division, 47 from the 129th, and 22 from the 120th) against the Japanese-held cities and the railway lines linking them. According to CCP's official statement, the battle started on 20 August. From 20 August to 10 September, communist forces attacked the railway line that separated the communist base areas, chiefly those from Dezhou to Shijiazhuang in Hebei, Shijiazhuang to Taiyuan in central Shanxi, and Taiyuan to Datong in northern Shanxi. Originally Peng's order of battle consisted of 20 regiments and on 22 August he found more than 80 regiments took part, mostly without telling him.

They succeeded in blowing up bridges and tunnels and ripping up track, and went on for the rest of September to attack Japanese garrisons frontally. About  of railways were destroyed, and the Jingxing coal mine—which was important to the Japanese war industry—was rendered inoperative for six months. It was the greatest victory the CCP fought and won during the war.

However, from October to December, the Japanese responded in force, reasserting control of railway lines and conducting aggressive "mopping up operations" in the rural areas around them. On 22 December, Mao Zedong told Peng Dehuai "Don't declare the end of the offensive yet. Chiang Kai-shek is launching anti-communist climax and we need the influence of Hundred Regiment Battle to win propaganda."

Results
The Eighth Army had left two reports that are both based on statistics before December 5, one claiming the killing or injuring 12,645 Japanese and 5,153 puppet troops; the capturing of 281 Japanese and 1,407 puppet troops; the defection of 7 Japanese and 1,845 puppet troops; 293 strong-points taken. The other one claimed the killing or injuring of 20,645 Japanese and 5,155 puppet troops; the capturing of 281 Japanese and 18,407 puppet troops; the defection of 47 Japanese and 1,845 puppet troops defected; 2,993 strongpoints taken. These two records were both based on the same figure but separated to two different records for unknown reason. This amounted to 21,338 and 46,000 combat successes respectively. In 2010, a Chinese article by Pan Zeqin said that the combat success result should be more than 50,000.《中国人民解放军全史》军事历史研究部 编，军事科学出版社，2000年，，卷“中国人民解放军战役战斗总览” There are no figures concerning total casualties in Japanese military records but 276 KIAs were recorded for the 4th Independent Mixed Brigade and 133 KIAs and 31 MIAs for the 2nd Independent Mixed Brigade. A western source recorded 20,900 Japanese casualties and about 20,000 collaborator casualties.

The Chinese also recorded 474 km of railway and 1502 km of road sabotaged, 213 bridges and 11 tunnels blown up, and 37 stations destroyed. But Japanese records give 73 bridges, 3 tunnels, and 5 water towers blown up; 20 stations burned, and 117 incidents of railway sabotage (amounting to 44 km). The damage done to communication systems consisted of 1,333 cable posts cut down and 1,107 turned over, with up to 146 km of cable cut. One mining site of Jingxing Coal Mine also stopped operating for half a year.

Aftermath
When General Yasuji Okamura took command of the North China Area Army in the summer 1941, the new strategy was "Three All", meaning "kill all, burn all, and destroy all" in those areas containing anti-Japanese forces. Mao never would again mount any conventional or massed guerrilla campaign during the war.

Controversies
Peng and Mao had disagreed over how directly to confront the Japanese since at least the Luochuan Conference in August 1937, with Mao concerned about Communist losses to the well equipped Japanese.  After the establishment of the People's Republic Mao is alleged to have said to Lin Biao that "allowing Japan to occupy more territory is the only way to love your country.  Otherwise, it would have become a country that loved Chiang Kai-shek."  Thus, the Hundred Regiments Offensive became the last of the two major Communist frontal engagements against the Japanese during the war. There had been controversy that Peng had no authorization, even no knowledge of the Central Military Committee and Mao Zedong. As early as 1945 the accusation of launching battles without telling Mao had appeared in the North China Conference. During the Great Leap Forward, Peng's opposition to Mao's policies led to his downfall and then the launching of the battle became yet again a criminal action in the Cultural Revolution. In 1967, the Red Guard group of Tsinghua University, with the support of the Central Cultural Revolution Committee, issued a leaflet saying "The rogue Peng, along with Zhu De, launched the offensive to defend Chongqing and Xi'an... He rejected Chairman Mao's instruction and mobilized 105 regiments in an adventuristic impulse ... Chairman Mao said 'How can Peng Dehuai make such a big move without consulting me? Our forces are completely revealed. The result will be terrible.'"

Peng admitted in his memoir 彭德怀自述 that he ordered the launch in late July, without awaiting the green light from the Central Military Committee and he regretted it. But Pan Zeqin said that it was Peng's incorrect memory, the correct start date should have officially been on August 20, so Peng actually had the green light. Nie Rongzhen defended Peng, stating "there is a legend that the Central Military Committee was not informed about the offensive in advance. After investigation, we found out that Eighth Army HQ sent a report to the top. The report mentioned we would strike at and sabotage Zhentai Railway. Sabotaging one railway or another is very common in guerilla warfare so it's our routine work. This is not some strategic issue and the Committee won't say no". He mentioned no exact date of launch. The consensus in China after the Cultural Revolution is generally in support of the battle. But a modern Chinese article stated that "Liu Bocheng had another opinion on Peng's arbitrary launching of the battle."

While a successful campaign, Mao later attributed it as the main provocation for the devastating Japanese Three Alls Policy later, and used it to criticize Peng at the Lushan Conference; by doing so, Mao successfully deflected criticism for launching the economically disastrous Great Leap Forward in the previous year.

 Citations 

 General references 
 The Battle of One Hundred Regiments, from Kataoka, Tetsuya; Resistance and Revolution in China: The Communists and the Second United Front''. Berkeley: University of California Press, [1974].
 森松俊夫 「中国戦線 百団大戦の敗北と勝利」(Morimatsu Toshio: Chinese Front: The Defeat and Victory of Hundred Regiment Offensive)『増刊  歴史と人物 137号 秘録・太平洋戦争』 中央公論社、1982年。

External links
 Map of the 100 Regiments Offensive
 Map of the 100 Regiments Offensive and Japanese counter attacks with units ID

1940 in China
1940 in Japan
Battles of the Second Sino-Japanese War
Conflicts in 1940